Brebu may refer to several places in Romania:

 Brebu, Caraș-Severin, a commune in Caraș-Severin County
 Brebu, Prahova, a commune in Prahova County 
 Brebu Monastery, constructed in 1640
 Brebu Nou, a commune in Caraș-Severin County
 Brebu, a village in Lopătari Commune, Buzău County
 Brebu, a village in Runcu Commune, Dâmbovița County
 Brebu (Bâsca), a tributary of the Bâsca Mică in Buzău County
 Brebu, a tributary of the Slănic in Buzău County
 Brebu, a tributary of the Timiș in Caraș-Severin County

See also 
 Breb (disambiguation)
 Brebina (disambiguation)